Landa may refer to:
Landa (surname)
Landa, real estate investing company
Landa, Álava, a village in Basque Country, Spain
Landa, North Dakota, United States
Laṇḍā, a class of scripts in Northern India

See also
Landa de Matamoros, Mexico
Lahnda, a group of language varieties also known as Western Punjabi
Lamda (disambiguation)